Ruth Mukalukho Ingosi (born 19 December 1993) is a Kenyan footballer who plays as a defender for Cypriot First Division club Lakatamia FC and the Kenya women's national team.

International career
Ingosi capped for Kenya at senior level during the 2019 CECAFA Women's Championship.

See also
List of Kenya women's international footballers

References

1993 births
Living people
People from Kakamega
Kenyan women's footballers
Women's association football defenders
Kenya women's international footballers
Kenyan expatriate  footballers
Kenyan expatriates in Cyprus
Expatriate women's footballers in Cyprus